Matthew O'Reilly Dease (1819 – 17 August 1887) was an Irish Liberal politician.

Dease was the son of Richard Dease and Anna Maria O'Reilly, daughter of Matthew O'Reilly. He was born in Dublin and educated at Trinity College, Dublin. 

He was elected unopposed as one of the two Members of Parliament (MPs) for County Louth at the 1868 general election but was defeated at the next election in 1874.

He was also a Justice of the Peace and Deputy Lieutenant for County Louth. He was High Sheriff of Louth for 1857, and for County Cavan in 1861.

Dease owned a significant amount of land across Ireland, 6,488 acres in all, including land in Ballyamona, County Limerick, Charleville in County Louth (nearly 2,000 acres), County Cavan, County Meath, and Dublin. His largest estate, at 2,366 acres, was in County Mayo, and was sold to the Congested Districts' Board on 2 December 1898. His entailed estates in County Louth were inherited by Edmond O'Conor of Charleville, a distant relative.

References

External links
 

1819 births
1887 deaths
Irish Liberal Party MPs
UK MPs 1868–1874
High Sheriffs of County Louth
High Sheriffs of Cavan
Members of the Parliament of the United Kingdom for County Louth constituencies (1801–1922)
19th-century Irish landowners
Alumni of Trinity College Dublin
Politicians from Dublin (city)